Jian Zengjiao is a retired professional wushu taolu athlete originally from Liaoning, China. He is currently a performer in Cirque du Soleil's Kà and is a coach in Las Vegas, United States.

Career 
Jian started practicing wushu at the age of six and was selected to become a member of the Liaoning provincial wushu team in 1990. In 1995, he declared his retirement and moved to the United States to work in stunts, with his most notable appearance being in Warriors of Virtue (1997). After two years abroad, he returned to China and upon recommendation by former Liaoning athlete, Liu Qinghua, he joined the Beijing Wushu Team under coach Wu Bin. After winning the national championship title in daoshu, he became the world champion in the same event at the 1999 World Wushu Championships in Hong Kong. Two years later, he won the silver medal at the 2001 National Games of China in men's daoshu and gunshu. He subsequently retired from competitive wushu.

In 2003, Jian along with fellow Beijing team members He Jing De and Li Jing as well as former Hong Kong team member Lo Nga Ching joined Cirque du Soleil's upcoming newest show, Kà. Jian would be the only performer to stay with the show for a prolonged period of time, eventually becoming a coach of the martial arts and stunts team. With Kà, he was a guest performer in The Tonight Show with Jay Leno and in America's Got Talent. In Las Vegas, Jian married Altanzul "Zula" Ulambayar, a fellow performer from Kà. They opened their school, Las Vegas Modern Kung Fu, in 2008. In 2020, he taught for the IWUF Online Wushu Classroom.

References

External links 

 Jian Zengjiao on People Are Awesome

1976 births
Living people
Chinese wushu practitioners
Sportspeople from Liaoning
Cirque du Soleil performers
American stunt performers
American wushu practitioners
Chinese expatriate sportspeople in the United States